HTML-Kit is a proprietary HTML editor for Microsoft Windows made by chami.com.
The application is a full-featured HTML editor designed to edit, format, validate, preview and publish web pages in HTML, XHTML and XML -languages.

HTML-Kit is freeware, although extra features are available at a cost to registered users.

An Alpha version, HTML-Kit Tools (previously named build 300), is in development and is currently only available for download by registered users. Build 292, the current stable build is available for download as freeware.

Features 

HTML-Kit colours HTML code and has built-in preview. It includes internal, external, server-side and live preview modes; FTP Workspace for uploading, downloading and online editing of files.

HTML-Kit can be extended with plugins. Over 400 free plugins are available for download via the program's web site. The default installation of HTML Kit does include some plugins of general utility, such as HTML Tidy for creating standards-compliant HTML/XHTML pages, a library of code snippets and an HTML color picker.

HTML-Kit enables running batch actions such as global search and replace in multiple files, Internet Explorer and Mozilla / Netscape side-by-side previewing, W3C Web Content Accessibility Guidelines checking through HTML Tidy, internal Command Prompt, TimeTracker, translations, Text to Speech Wizard and UnicodePad.

Syntax highlighting
As of version 292, HTML-Kit supports syntax highlighting for languages such as :

HTML
Extensible HyperText Markup Language (XHTML)
Extensible Markup Language (XML)
Cascading Style Sheets (CSS)
Extensible Stylesheet Language Transformations (XSLT)
Visual Basic (VB)
Visual Basic Script Edition (VBScript)
PHP
Perl
Python
Ruby
C/C++
C#
Pascal
Lisp
SQL
Active Server Pages (ASP)
Java
JavaScript
JavaServer Pages (JSP)

Ratings 

HTML-Kit gets a 5-star rating by download.com and 4-star rating by php-editors.

See also

 List of HTML editors
 Comparison of HTML editors
 Comparison of WYSIWYG HTML editors
 HTML Tidy

External links
 HTML-Kit official site
 Review and Download from download.com
 Review and Features Description
 Review at php-editors.com
 Tutorial:Improved Web Development using HTML-Kit at devarticles.com

HTML editors